The Leading Ladies of Entertainment is an honor presented annually by the Latin Recording Academy, the same organization that distributes the Latin Grammy Awards, to commend women "excelling in the arts and sciences, and who have made indelible impressions and contributions to the Latin entertainment industry." Award recipients are honored during "Latin Grammy Week", a string of galas prior to the annual Latin Grammy Awards ceremony. The accolade was established by the organization to acknowledge the gender gap in the Latin entertainment industry. Then-president of the Latin Recording Academy, Gabriel Abaroa explained: "Women face a myriad of difficulties in the entertainment industry, but despite those obstacles, the women we are honoring have continually demonstrated perseverance, fortitude, and grace under pressure." A portion of the sponsorships on the events are used to fund scholarships to young women studying in music. The awards were first presented to Marcella Araica, Leila Cobo, Erika Ender, Rebeca Leon, and Gabriela Martinez. The event was held twice in 2019, the first as a Mexican edition in June and again during the Latin Grammy Week in November.

Recipients

 With the exception of the 2019 Mexican edition, each year is linked to an article about the Latin Grammy Awards ceremony of that year.

See also
 List of Latin Grammy Awards categories
 List of media awards honoring women

References

General
 

Specific

External links
 Latin Grammy Awards

Awards established in 2017
Leading Ladies of Entertainment
Business and industry awards honoring women
Music awards honoring women